Lester D. Menke (December 16, 1918 – March 5, 2016) was a state Representative from the Iowa's 5th and 7th Districts. He served in the Iowa House of Representatives from 1973 to 1985, serving as Speaker pro Tempore from 1981 to 1985. After he served in the Iowa House, Menke served as a liaison between Governor Terry Branstad and the legislature for two years. Menke has a B.A. from Morningside College, where he later served as a member of the board of directors, and attended The University of Iowa College of Law for one year. He worked as a farm owner and for an insurance agency. He served on various school boards and served as president of the Iowa Association of School Boards and State Board of Public Instruction and as director of the National Association of State Boards of Education, as well as serving on the Iowa Educational Radio and Television Facilities Board. Menke received Morningside College's Distinguished Alumni award in 1975.

References

Citations

General references

External links
Iowa General Assembly - Lester Menke official government website
Lester Menke Obituary Des Moines Register

1918 births
2016 deaths
School board members in Iowa
Republican Party members of the Iowa House of Representatives
People from O'Brien County, Iowa
Morningside University alumni
University of Iowa College of Law alumni
Businesspeople from Iowa
Farmers from Iowa
20th-century American businesspeople